Doug Clark is a former member of the Arizona House of Representatives from January 2007 until January 2009. He was elected to the House for his only term in November 2006, representing District 6. He did not run for re-election in 2008.

References

Republican Party members of the Arizona House of Representatives
Living people
Year of birth missing (living people)